Osan is a city in Gyeonggi Province, South Korea, approximately  south of Seoul. The population of the city is around 200,000.  The local economy is supported by a mix of agricultural and industrial enterprises.

It is famous for one of the largest markets in South Korea, Osan Market, which has been in continuous operation since 1792. The city was the scene of the first battle between the US and North Korea during the Korean War in 1950; there is a statue and museum dedicated to UN forces on the outskirts of the city.

Osan Station is a large subway station located in the heart of Osan. It is part of the Seoul Subway Line 1 and the KTX. There is a bus terminal next to the subway station and many buses stop in front of the subway station.

Name
Osan came to be called by its current name in 1914, at the time of a general reorganization of local governments under Japanese rule. At that time it became Osan-myeon, part of Suwon. This name in turn was taken from that of a local stream, the Osancheon. However, prior to the Japanese occupation, the name had been rendered in hanja as 鰲山, meaning "soft-shelled turtle mountain." Because of the complexity of the 鰲 ("o") character, and because crows were abundant in the area, the Japanese changed the name to 烏山, meaning "crow mountain school."

Statistics
 based on the data created in dec 2011

Administrative districts
The administrative districts of Osan City consists of six administrative districts and 24 legal districts. Osan City has a population of 228,111 and 97,348 households as of the end of June 2020.

Climate
Osan has a humid continental climate (Köppen: Dwa), but can be considered a borderline humid subtropical climate (Köppen: Cwa) using the  isotherm.

Sister cities
 Hidaka, Saitama, Japan  
 Ürümqi, Xinjiang, China
 Killeen, Texas, U.S.
 Miami, Florida, U.S.
 Qazvin, Iran

Economy
Kyochon, a fried chicken chain, has its head office in Osan.

See also
 List of cities in South Korea
 Geography of South Korea

References

External links
City government website 
City Council website 

 

 
Cities in Gyeonggi Province